Signe Swensson (23 November 1888 in Trondhjem – 22 April 1974) was a Norwegian physician and politician for the Conservative Party of Norway. She served as a Member of Parliament from 1931 to 1936 and as president of the Norwegian Association for Women's Rights in 1956.

Originally trained as a teacher at Oslo Teacher's College in 1912, she got her cand.med. degree in 1922, and worked as a district physician in Frøya, Sør-Trøndelag before settling in Trondhjem as a specialist in skin diseases in 1927.

She was president of the Norwegian Association of Female Professionals 1936–46, member of the city council of Trondheim 1937-47 and president of the Norwegian Association for Women's Rights.

Her father was Swedish-born businessman Pehr Gustaf Swensson and her brother was physician Nils Victor Swensson.

References 

Norwegian women's rights activists
Women members of the Storting
1888 births
1974 deaths
Members of the Storting
Conservative Party (Norway) politicians
People from Trondheim
20th-century Norwegian politicians
20th-century Norwegian women politicians
Norwegian Association for Women's Rights people